PLA Nanjing Political College is a state university administered by the People's Liberation Army General Political Department of the People's Republic of China. The university is located in Gulou District of Nanjing, Jiangsu province. The university is a member of Project 211. The university has two campuses.

History
It was formed in 1977 and initially called "PLA Nanjing Political School". In June 1986, it was renamed "PLA Nanjing Political College". In May 1999, PLA Air Force Political College merged into the university.

Affiliated hospital
The Affiliated Hospital of PLA Nanjing Political College, was founded in 1988.

References

 
Educational institutions established in 1977
People's Liberation Army
Military education and training in China